Pol Varzeh (also Romanized as Pal Varzah) is a village in Mian Jam Rural District, in the Central District of Torbat-e Jam County, Razavi Khorasan Province, Iran. At the 2006 census, its population was 480, in 96 families.

References 

Populated places in Torbat-e Jam County